New York Bar Association may refer to

 New York City Bar Association
 New York State Bar Association